Tarash is an upazila of Sirajganj District in the Division of Rajshahi, Bangladesh.

Geography
It has 26254 households and total area 297.2 km2. The upazila is bounded by Sherpur (Bogura) upazila on the north, Bhangura and Chatmohar upazilas on the south, Raiganj and Ullahpara upazilas on the east, Gurudaspur and Singra upazilas on the west.

Demographics
As of the 2011 Bangladesh census, Tarash has a population of 195964. Males constituted 99,240, and females 96,724. This Upazila's eighteen up population is 98421. Tarash has an average literacy rate of 39% (7+ years), and the national average of 60.0% literate.

Administration
Tarash, primarily formed as a Thana, was turned into an upazila in 1983.

Tarash Upazila is divided into Tarash Municipality and eight union parishads:Talam, Baruhas, Deshigram, Madhainagar, Magura Binod, Naogaon, Saguna, and Tarash. The union parishads are subdivided into 171 mauzas and 254 villages.

Notable people
Ataur Rahman (politician)
Gazi M M Amjad Hossain

See also
Upazilas of Bangladesh
Districts of Bangladesh
Divisions of Bangladesh

References

এক নজরে তাড়াশ (in Bengali)

Upazilas of Sirajganj District